Matthew and Son is the debut studio album by English singer-songwriter Cat Stevens, released in March 1967.

Overview
Stevens began writing songs during his early teenage years. His earliest influences included the sound of early British bands, such as the Beatles and the Rolling Stones, influenced by popular American rhythm and blues. At the same time, folk influences from artists such as Bob Dylan and Simon & Garfunkel left a strong mark on him, along with some of the musicals being performed so close to his childhood home in Soho that he could often hear them drifting through his room. Stevens's older brother, David Gordon, attracted the attention of music producer Mike Hurst, formerly of the Springfields, in the hope of finding a producer interested in his younger brother's music. After a demo was recorded, a deal was struck between the two. The album was not released until 1967; however, recording began on 10 July 1966, with a few advance singles appearing around that time.

Advance singles 
Although the album was not released until 1967, the first advance single, "I Love My Dog", was released in 1966. It was initially recorded only by Stevens' guitars, piano and vocals. Hurst, however, encouraged Stevens to add a staccato and tympani–and–viola arrangement. Session bassist John Paul Jones played on the first singles two years before becoming a member of Led Zeppelin. The lyrics for the B-side of the first single, "Portobello Road", were written by Kim Fowley, who encouraged Stevens to compose a melody for the song. The single initially reached No. 28 on the UK charts, followed by "Matthew and Son", the next single and title track, which went to No. 2 on the UK charts, making Stevens into a popular and clean-cut teenage crooner.

Release and reception 
Matthew and Son was released in 1967, eventually reaching No. 7 in the UK. The album track "Here Comes My Baby" was initially recorded and released by the Tremeloes, and was a hit, reaching No. 4 in the UK. "I've Found a Love" was covered by British singer David Garrick but failed to chart, while Stevens's own "I'm Gonna Get Me a Gun" reached No. 6.

"Here Comes My Baby" was used in the Wes Anderson film Rushmore.

Music critic Robert Christgau of The Village Voice later called Matthew and Son "a rarity: a forgotten record that shouldn't be", and said that both its title track and "I Love My Dog" were "two rock songs we should have heard more of in 1967". AllMusic's Bruce Eder gave it three-and-a-half out of five stars and said that "it's very distant from the sound that Stevens was ultimately known for, and in many ways, it's more dated than what he did for Island/A&M, but it's much more self-consciously accessible, arranged in different styles".

Track listing 
All songs by Cat Stevens, except where noted.

British LP and CD releases

American LP release

Personnel 

 Cat Stevens - vocals, guitar, keyboards
 John Paul Jones - bass guitar on "Matthew and Son"
Nicky Hopkins - keyboards on "Matthew and Son"
 Alan Tew and Mike Hurst - arrangements
Technical
 Mike Hurst - producer, engineer, liner notes
 Vic Smith - engineer

References

External links 
 

1967 debut albums
Cat Stevens albums
Deram Records albums